The Third and Townsend Depot was the main train station in the city of San Francisco for much of the first three quarters of the 20th century. The station at Third Street and Townsend Street served as the northern terminus for Southern Pacific's Peninsula Commute line between San Francisco and San Jose (forerunner of Caltrain) and long-distance trains between San Francisco and Los Angeles via the Southern Pacific's Coast Line. For service for destinations to the north, such as Seattle, and destinations to the east, such as Chicago, passengers generally needed to travel to Oakland, initially on ferries to Oakland Long Wharf, and later on buses to 16th Street Station. It was demolished in the 1970s and replaced by the Caltrain commuter station a block away at Fourth and King Streets.

History
The station was built in 1914–15 on the occasion of the Panama–Pacific International Exposition to be held in 1915. It replaced a previous terminal built in 1889, which was moved to make way for it and then became known as "The Old Depot". (The first San Francisco terminal had been at Fourth and Brannan Streets, built in response to the Tidelands Bill of 1868, which granted the Central Pacific, Southern Pacific, and Western Pacific railroads  of land in Mission Bay on condition they provide a terminal station.) Originally the 1914 station was supposed to be temporary, with a main station to be built further downtown; the Southern Pacific had assembled some of the land they would need to extend the line to a terminal at Market Street and Embarcadero, facing the Ferry Building. However, this plan was never carried out, and Third and Townsend served as San Francisco's train station for 62 years.

The depot was the terminus of Southern Pacific's Sunset Limited, running to New Orleans via Los Angeles. The service was cut back to Los Angeles in 1930, reinstated to San Francisco again in 1935, then cut back permanently in 1942.

The station had its last long distance train on April 30, 1971, when the Southern Pacific yielded operation of the Coast Daylight  to Amtrak and the Del Monte was discontinued. Amtrak opted to consolidate most of its Bay Area service in Oakland. However, the bus connections between San Francisco and Oakland (and later Emeryville) continued, and are still operated as part of the Amtrak Thruway Motorcoach banner. 

With the rise of freeways and the loss of long-distance passenger rail service, Southern Pacific built the much smaller Fourth and King Street Station to serve the Peninsula Commute in 1975. Third and Townsend was demolished in 1975–76.

Description

Designed by the Southern Pacific Architectural Bureau, the station was two stories, built of reinforced concrete in the characteristic Mission Revival architecture style, and was one of the best examples of the style in San Francisco. The railroad intended the style to "link San Francisco more closely with the romance and sentiment of the settlement of California", and planned to include interior murals on that theme. The initial announcement of the design included giving customers a choice of free and paying bathrooms, for the first time in a Western train station. There was a baggage building, a commissary, and a Pullman storeroom. The roofs were tiled and arcades and door canopies sheltered passengers from the weather on two sides. The interiors were finished in oak. The waiting room had a marble floor, measured , with a  ceiling, and was lit on three sides by amber-glassed windows.

Local bus and streetcar services were provided by the Market Street Railway and later the San Francisco Municipal Railway.

References

External links

Passenger rail transportation in California
Transportation in the San Francisco Bay Area
History of San Francisco
Railway stations in the United States opened in 1914
Demolished railway stations in the United States
San Francisco
1914 establishments in California